Jacob Collard is an Australian professional footballer who plays as  right back for Oakleigh Cannons FC.

Early life
Collard is an Indigenous Australian. 

He was raised in Perth, attending South Thornlie Primary School and Lynwood Senior High School.

Club career

Collard made his competitive debut for Perth as a substitute in a win over Newcastle Jets in the 2015 FFA Cup. He made his A-League debut for the club against Adelaide United on 9 January 2020. In his second A-League appearance, one week later, Collard was sent off in the 63rd minute.

After failing to secure a professional contract with Perth, Collard joined Tasmanian side Olympia on 5 March 2016. Collard left the club in April 2016, to move to Melbourne.

Collard joined National Premier Leagues Victoria side Oakleigh Cannons in May 2016.

Outside football
Before playing for Perth Glory, Collard worked as a plumber.

In 2017, Collard undertook a Western Australia Police cadetship for Indigenous Australians.

See also
List of Indigenous Australian sportspeople
List of Perth Glory FC players (1–24 appearances)

External links

References

1995 births
Living people
Association football defenders
Indigenous Australian soccer players
Australian soccer players
Perth Glory FC players
Oakleigh Cannons FC players
National Premier Leagues players
A-League Men players
Australian police officers